Ask Greiffenberg (born 3 August 1973) is a Danish television producer and television director. He works at BLU, part of FremantleMedia.

Biography

Ask Greiffenberg started his own company "Hip-Sound" in 1995. It was later renamed "Bolsjevik".
The company is now called "Popgun" and is developing software automation tools for the broadcast industry.

Recent productions 
Talent 09

Awards 
Ask Greiffenberg received an award for Best Entertainment Show in 2007 at the annual Danish TV Festival for Gu'skelov Du Kom (the Danish version of Thank God You're Here).

References 

Danish television producers
1973 births
Living people